Yashwant Bhimrao Ambedkar (12 December 1912 — 17 September 1977), also known as Bhaiyasaheb Ambedkar, was an Indian socio-religious activist, newspaper editor, politician, and activist of Ambedkarite Buddhist movement. He was the first and only surviving child of Ramabai Ambedkar and B. R. Ambedkar, Indian polymath, human rights activist, and the first law minister of India. Yashwant devoted his life to Buddhism after the demise of his father and kept pace his father's struggle for social equality. He tried to keep the Ambedkarite community united and also took an active part in the Dalit Buddhist movement.

After his father died in 1956, he became the second president of the Buddhist Society of India and continued his father's struggle. In 1968, he organized an All India Buddhist Conference. After his death, his wife Mira became the president of the Buddhist Society of India. He had four children, including Prakash Yashwant Ambedkar.

He had been the editor of the "Janata" newspaper since 1942.

Personal life 

Yashwant Ambedkar was born on 12 December 1912 in Bombay. On 19 April 1953, he married Meera Ambedkar in a Buddhist manner. They have four children - Prakash, Ramā, Bhimrao and Anandraj. His only daughter Rama is married to Anand Teltumbde.

Religious work 
On 14 October 1956, he converted to Navayana Buddhism. After the death of his father Babasaheb Ambedkar on 6 December 1956, he became the second president of the Buddhist Society of India. This position he held until his death (1956-1977). In 1958, he represented India at the World Buddhist Conference in Bangkok, Thailand.

He erected many Buddhist temples, and monuments of Babasaheb Ambedkar. On 2 August 1958, at Bhimnagar in Pune, he erected a full-sized bronze statue of Babasaheb Ambedkar.

Babasaheb Ambedkar's tomb Chaitya Bhoomi memorial work was completed by Yashwant Ambedkar's efforts.

He represented India at the World Buddhist Conference in Sri Lanka in 1972.

Political work 
Yashwant Ambedkar was the co-founder of the Republican Party of India, which has its roots in the Scheduled Castes Federation led by B. R. Ambedkar. On 30 September 1956, B. R. Ambedkar announced the establishment of the "Republican Party of India" by dismissing the "Scheduled Castes Federation", but before the formation of the party, he died on 6 December 1956. After that, his followers and activists planned to form this party. A meeting of the Presidency was held in Nagpur on 1 October 1957 to establish the party. At this meeting, N. Sivaraj, Yashwant Ambedkar, P. T. Borale, A. G. Pawar, Datta Katti, Dadasaheb Rupwate were present. The Republican Party of India was formed on 3 October 1957. N. Sivaraj was elected as the President of the party.

He was a member of the Maharashtra Legislative Council from 1960 to 1966.

RPI President N. Sivaraj elected Ambedkar as the Mumbai State President of RPI in 1964. RPI started agitation for landless people in 1959.

Death 

He died on 17 September 1977. More than one million people attended his funeral. He was cremated in a Buddhist manner in Mumbai at the Dadar Cemetery (next to the Chaityabhoomi Stupa).

Books on Ambedkar
 "Suryaputra Yashwantrao Ambedkar" (The son of sun: Yashwant Ambedkar) — writer: Phulchandra Khobragade; Sanket Prakashan, Nagpur, 2014
 "Loknete Bhaiyasaheb Ambedkar" (The people's leader: Bhaiyasaheb Ambedkar) — writer: Prakash Janjal, Ramai Prakashan, 2019

See also 
 Savita Ambedkar
 Ambedkar family

Notes

References 

1912 births
1977 deaths
Indian Buddhists
20th-century Buddhists
Indian civil rights activists
Y
Members of the Maharashtra Legislative Council
Marathi politicians
Republican Party of India politicians
Social workers
Social workers from Maharashtra
Converts to Buddhism from Hinduism
Dalit activists
Activists from Maharashtra
Indian newspaper editors
20th-century Indian politicians
Buddhist activists
Bombay State politicians
Indian newspaper journalists
Indian newspaper publishers (people)
Scheduled Castes Federation politician